Atlantic Power Corporation headquartered in Dedham, Massachusetts, is a power generation and infrastructure company with a portfolio of assets in the United States and Canada. The company is engaged in power generation through hydro, natural gas, biomass, and coal fired power plants. The company was acquired by private equity firm I Squared Capital in 2021 and delisted from the New York and Toronto stock exchanges.

References

External links
 
 Official website

Electric power companies of the United States
Companies based in Dedham, Massachusetts
Energy companies established in 2004
Non-renewable resource companies established in 2004
American companies established in 2004
Companies formerly listed on the New York Stock Exchange
Companies formerly listed on the Toronto Stock Exchange